Hans Lufft (1495–1584) was a German printer and publisher, commonly called "the Bible Printer," because in 1534 he printed at Wittenberg the first complete edition of Luther's Bible, in two Folio volumes with woodcut illustrations by Lucas Cranach. Lufft printed in the 40 years following more than 100,000 copies of the German Bible. He also printed many of Luther’s other works.

References 

 Gustav Georg Zeltner, biography of Lufft (Altdorf, 1727) 
 Von Dommer, Die ältesten Drucke aus Marburg in Hessen, 1527-1566 (Marburg, 1892) 

1495 births
1584 deaths
German printers
German publishers (people)
16th-century German people